Ricky Henry (born July 27, 1987) is a former American football offensive guard. He was signed by the Chicago Bears as an undrafted free agent in 2011. He played college football at Nebraska.

Henry has also played for the Atlanta Falcons, New Orleans Saints, and Kansas City Chiefs

College career
Henry was a First-team All-Big 12 after Senior season at Nebraska and also won the Pat Clare Award.

Professional career

Chicago Bears
On July 26, 2011, Henry signed with the Chicago Bears as an undrafted free agent. On September 3, 2011, he was released.  On September 4, he was signed to the practice squad. On November 16, 2011, he was promoted to the active roster. On August 31, 2012, he was released.

New Orleans Saints
On September 1, 2012, Henry signed with the New Orleans Saints to join their practice squad. On December 15, 2012, he was promoted to the active roster. On August 19, 2013, he was waived by the Saints.

Kansas City Chiefs
On August 20, 2013, Henry was claimed off waivers by the Kansas City Chiefs. He was released during final preseason roster cut downs on August 30, 2014. The next day he was signed to the Chiefs practice squad.

Carolina Panthers
On June 17, 2015, Henry was signed by the Carolina Panthers. He was released on September 5, 2015.

References

External links
Nebraska Huskers bio
Chicago Bears bio
New Orleans Saints bio

1987 births
Living people
American football offensive guards
Nebraska Cornhuskers football players
Chicago Bears players
New Orleans Saints players
Kansas City Chiefs players
Carolina Panthers players